The Puebla Institute of Technology is an institution of higher education in Puebla, México. The institute was founded in 1972. It is a public school, dependant of the Secretariat of Public Education (Secretaría de Educación Pública). It offers 9 undergraduate and 3 graduate programs in engineering, technology and management areas. It is part of the National Technological Institute of Mexico and the National Association of Universities and Higher Education Institutions (ANUIES).

References

Technical universities and colleges in Mexico
Universities and colleges in Puebla
Educational institutions established in 1972
1972 establishments in Mexico
Public universities and colleges in Mexico